The 2018 Copa Colsanitas (also known as the 2018 Claro Open Colsanitas for sponsorship reasons) was a women's tennis tournament played on outdoor clay courts. It was the 21st edition of the Copa Colsanitas, and part of the International category of the 2018 WTA Tour. It took place at the Centro de Alto Rendimiento in Bogotá, Colombia, from April 9 through April 15, 2018.

Points and prize money

Point distribution

Prize money 

*per team

Singles main-draw entrants

Seeds 

1 Rankings as of 2 April 2018.

Other entrants 
The following players received wildcards into the main draw:
  Emiliana Arango
  María Herazo González 
  María Camila Osorio Serrano

The following players received entry from the qualifying draw:
  Lizette Cabrera 
  Valentini Grammatikopoulou
  Elitsa Kostova 
  Victoria Rodríguez 
  Daniela Seguel 
  Renata Zarazúa

Withdrawals 
Before the tournament 
  Eugenie Bouchard → replaced by  Georgina García Pérez
  Sara Errani → replaced by  Carol Zhao
  Beatriz Haddad Maia → replaced by  Anna Blinkova
  Daria Kasatkina → replaced by  Tereza Martincová
  Francesca Schiavone → replaced by  Ysaline Bonaventure
  Sachia Vickery → replaced by  Irina Falconi

Retirements 
  Emiliana Arango

Doubles main-draw entrants

Seeds 

 Rankings as of 2 April 2018.

Other entrants 
The following pairs received wildcards into the doubles main draw:
  María Herazo González /  Yuliana Lizarazo
  María Camila Osorio Serrano /  Jessica Plazas

Champions

Singles 

  Anna Karolína Schmiedlová def.  Lara Arruabarrena, 6–2, 6–4

Doubles 

  Dalila Jakupović /  Irina Khromacheva def.  Mariana Duque Mariño /  Nadia Podoroska, 6–3, 6–4

References

External links 
 

Copa Claro Colsanitas
Copa Colsanitas
Copa Claro Colsanitas